Vampires is a 2020 French-language supernatural horror streaming television series created by Benjamin Dupas and Isaure Pisani-Ferry and starring Oulaya Amamra, Suzanne Clément, Aliocha Schneider, Kate Moran, Mounir Amamra and Juliette Cardinski. 

The plot revolves around Doina (Oulaya Amamra), a vampire girl who suppress her vampire tendencies by taking pills, and who lives with her mother, Martha (Suzanne Clément).

It was released on 20 March 2020 on Netflix.

Cast
 Oulaya Amamra as Doina Radescu
 Suzanne Clément as Martha Radescu
 Aliocha Schneider as Ladislas Nemeth
 Kate Moran as Csilla Nemeth
 Mounir Amamra as Andrea Radescu
 Juliette Cardinski as Irina Radescu
 Pierre Lottin as Rad Radescu
 Dylan Robert as Nacer
 Antonia Buresi as Elise
 Bilel Chegrani as Moji
 Theo Hakola as Gabor Nemeth
 Ayumi Roux as Clarisse
 Jalal Altawil as Stan
 Jonathan Genet as Auguste
 Marilú Marini as Belen

Release
Vampires was released on 20 March 2020 on Netflix.

References

External links
 
 
 

2020 French television series debuts
French fantasy television series
French horror fiction television series
2020s French drama television series
Television series about vampires